Kim Min-kyu (born 19 June 1990) is a South Korean foil fencer, bronze medallist in the individual event and gold medallist in the team event at the 2013 Asian Fencing Championships.

He reached the table of 16 at the 2014 World Fencing Championships before being defeated by Russia's Timur Safin, who eventually took the bronze medal.

References
 Profile on fencingworldwide.com

South Korean male foil fencers
Living people
1990 births
Asian Games medalists in fencing
Fencers at the 2014 Asian Games
Asian Games bronze medalists for South Korea
Medalists at the 2014 Asian Games